Ron-Thorben Hoffmann (born 4 April 1999) is a German professional footballer who plays as a goalkeeper for 2. Bundesliga club Eintracht Braunschweig.

Club career

FC Bayern Munich
Hoffmann made his 3. Liga debut for Bayern Munich II on 30 July 2019, starting in the away match against Hansa Rostock.

Sunderland AFC
On 31 August 2021, Hoffmann was loaned to Sunderland AFC for the 2021-22 season.  Prior to the loan move, Hoffmann signed a one-year contract extension to keep him with FC Bayern through 2023.

Eintracht Braunschweig
On 15 June 2022, Bayern Munich announced his departure as he would be transferred to recently promoted 2. Bundesliga club Eintracht Braunschweig, for a reported €300,000 fee.

International career
Hoffmann made two appearances for the German under-18 national team in 2016, debuting at half-time in a friendly match against the Republic of Ireland on 13 November 2016.

Career statistics

Honours
Bayern Munich
 Bundesliga: 2018–19
UEFA Champions League: 2019–20
 FIFA Club World Cup: 2020

Sunderland
 EFL League One play-offs: 2022

References

External links
 
 
 

1999 births
Living people
Sportspeople from Rostock
Footballers from Mecklenburg-Western Pomerania
German footballers
Germany youth international footballers
Association football goalkeepers
FC Bayern Munich II players
FC Bayern Munich footballers
Sunderland A.F.C. players
Eintracht Braunschweig players
3. Liga players
Regionalliga players
English Football League players
UEFA Champions League winning players
German expatriate footballers
Expatriate footballers in England
German expatriate sportspeople in England